Krakow UNESCO City of Literature is a City of Literature located in Krakow, Poland, as a member of the UNESCO Creative Cities Network. Krakow joined the UCCN on 21 October 2013 as the first Slavic and second non-English speaking city. Krakow’s main objective as a UNESCO City of Literature is to develop and implement a program promoting literary heritage, popularize reading among its residents, and support the local book market. Krakow UNESCO City of Literature also functions as a coordinator for the Cities of Literature and a member of the UCCN Steering Committee.

The Krakow UNESCO City of Literature program is operated by the Krakow Festival Office.

Program 
The program followed by Krakow City of Literature involves activities and initiatives in the following 10 areas of development:	

 Integrating literary life in all its richness and variety	
 Establishing links between literature, new media and creative industries	
 Creating reading attitudes
 Organising literary events and festivals
 Supporting book industries
 Initiating and supporting the presence of literature in public space
 Developing scholarship programs
 Developing the interrelationships between literature and human rights
 Reinforcing international literary cooperation
 Literary education

Projects

Festivals  
Krakow UNESCO City of Literature hosts two large literary festivals, i.e. the Conrad Festival (the greatest Polish event of its type), and the Milosz Festival. Both festivals were in 2017 granted the EFFE Label which is awarded by the European Festivals Association to events of international rank and distinctive artistic quality that are characterized by high involvement of the local community.

Debut support 
Krakow UNESCO City of Literature is involved in supporting young talents and literary debutants. Each year, during the Conrad Festival, the Conrad Award is awarded for the best literary debut. The “Promoters of Debuts” program has been developed in order to ensure funds for publishing houses to cover the cost of publication of debutant works. In addition, there is a UNESCO City of Literature Creative Writing Course which unites and educates young talents supervised by renowned and experienced writers.

Read PL! 
Read PL! is a project created in cooperation with the Woblink.com e-book platform to promote reading through permitting free access to electronic versions of new book arrivals and bestsellers. In public places (mostly at bus/tram stops and in schools) the organisers post posters with QR codes which can be scanned with the Woblink application to offer free access to selected books.

City Codes 
Within the City Codes project, the benches in the Krakow Planty Park have been marked with special tablets with the names of writers who have been important for the city of Krakow, together with QR codes that refer to websites with fragments of texts by specific authors, as well as their Polish and English audio versions.

Multipoetry. Poems on the walls 
During each first week of month, poems written by authors connected with other Cities of Literature – Dublin, Edinburg, Iowa City, Melbourne, Norwich and Reykjavik – were displayed on the wall of the Potocki Family Tenement House at 20 Main Market Square in 2014 and 2015.

Literary walks 
Krakow UNESCO City of Literature organises cyclic literary walks whereby readers led by their guides have an opportunity to see buildings and places that used to be or that are important for the most outstanding  writers living in Krakow. Several literary routes have been delineated so far within the project, including those dedicated to Wisława Szymborska, Czesław Miłosz, Stanisław Lem, Stanisław Wyspiański or Joseph Conrad.

Champion Bookstores in Krakow 
The project focuses on the cooperation with stationary bookstores in Krakow. It has been developed for the sake of readers, book lovers, and booksellers. Its task is to support the Krakow book market through the integration, coordination and implementation of the rich program of cultural events in Krakow stationary bookstores. The project is to equip booksellers with additional tools and promotion methods, to enrich their cultural offer, and build permanent relationships with readers.

Krakow Book Fair 
The Krakow Book Fair is a cyclic event that promotes the idea of second-hand book circulation. It is held once in every several weeks at the St. Mary Magdalene Square in Krakow, where a dozen or so of Krakow antiquarians and second-hand booksellers put up their stands and present their offer. The fair is always accompanied by discussions, literary meetings, and open-air shows.

Independent Bookstore Festival 
Independent Bookstore Festival is a project implemented in bookstores by the Copernicus Foundation under the patronage of Krakow UNESCO City of Literature. The Festival is a year-round series of events organised by booksellers for all readers who want to talk with one another about books.

Read locally 
The project aims at promoting bookstores as cultural centres and places where social ties begin. Read locally promotes most unique bookstores that carry out unique, proprietary and bottom-up cultural activity. The project includes a series of interviews with the staff and with famous frequent visitors of most interesting bookstores in Krakow.

The Second Life of a Book 
The action facilitates free book exchange. It is held cyclically at most interesting places that are connected with literature.

International Cooperation

ICORN (International Cities of Refuge Network) 
ICORN is an independent network of cities that offer a shelter to writers and artists persecuted for their creative work. It acts in defence of the freedom of expression and of democratic values. It also acts for international solidarity. The network’s member cities offer refuge to those who cannot freely live and create in their own homelands due to persecutions. ICORN’s main objective is to ensure asylum to as many persecuted writers and artists as possible, and to establish a permanent global network to defend the freedom of expression together with its sister organisations. Within the ICORN program in 2011-2017, Krakow hosted seven writers: Maria Amelie (born Madina Salamowa – North Ossetia, today in Norway), Kareem Amer (Egypt/today in Norway), Mostafa Zamaninij (Iran), Lawon Barszczewski (Belarus), Asli Erdogan (Turkey), Felix Kaputu (Congo), and Monem Mahjoub (Libya). While implementing the ICORN program, Krakow City of Literature cooperates with the Villa Decius Association that coordinates the residents’ stay and offers them space for their creative work.

Drop the Mic. Nordic-Baltic Slam Poetry Network 
Drop the Mic is a project that aims at creating an international space for poets, writers, authors of texts, and organisers of festivals and poetry slams that support performative literature. The project is to popularize the idea of poetry slams and to integrate poets and other authors at international level through their joint participation in projects. So far, events within the Drop the Mic (meetings, workshops, poetry slams) have been held in Reykjavik (Iceland), Tartu (Estonia), Copenhagen (Dania), Heidelberg (Germany), and Krakow

Engage! Young Producers 
Engage! Young Producers is an international educational project aimed at promoting young people’s committed participation in literary and cultural life interpreted as a means to develop their critical thinking skills and better comprehension of multicultural reality. The project is addressed mainly to secondary school students (between 16 and 19 years of age), especially those with little access to culture, and to all local organisations and cultural institutions whose activity involves literature. Engage! is held simultaneously in several European cities (Barcelona, Norwich, Vaxjo, Krakow), and always with the support of secondary schools, libraries and cultural institutions that develop their own customized programs so as to best apply the general objectives of the complete Engage! project. Within the Engage! Young Producers project the Krakow Festival Office implements a yearly education program for secondary school students – Word for Word. Poetry is my language.

Krakow UNESCO City of Literature Residency Program 
The residency program is addressed to writers and authors from the other UNESCO Cities of Literature. During their stipend stay in Krakow, residents have an opportunity to experience Krakow literary life, establish contacts with the local literary industry and writers. So far, Krakow has hosted Brynjar Jóhannesson from Reykjavik, Sarah Stewart from Edinburgh, and Sarah Herman from Norwich.

References

External links
 Official website

Culture in Kraków
UNESCO
Literary festivals in Poland